Dave Stitch (born 1979) is the recording pseudonym of UK-based electronic music artist David Brookes.

Electronic music and art
Stitch got his pseudonym in 1997 when he formed live electronic band Stitch.

In 1999, Stitch left Essex for London and joined the Headfuk Soundsystem. Headfuk soundsystem put on regular free parties and raves in and around London and other UK cities, as well as in mainland Europe, featuring Stitch performing a Techno live-set. Stitch's live-set at that time (1999–2005) consisted of an MC-303, a Boss DR-202 and a Novation Bass Station.

Influenced by Hakim Bey's Temporary Automous Zone concept and by DIY culture, Stitch was instrumental in the creation of the early Temporary Autonomous Art (TAA) exhibitions held in various squatted venues in London between 2001–2005 as part of the Random Artists collective.

Since 2010 he has also been one half of TR-33N, a live electronic music band with Louisa Yorke.

Personal life
Brookes was born in Colchester, Essex in 1979. His twin, Peter Brookes, suffered from severe cerebral palsy due to complications at their birth. Peter Brookes died in 2002, leaving Stitch a lone twin. In 2006 Stitch moved to rural Suffolk where he has a studio.

Discography
Headfuk Records volumes FUK 003-006 (2001–2003)
FAK 001-002 (2002)
Bernard's Haircut 2 - Crack [as 'The Proppa Authorities'] (2003)
Rave New World (2007)
Clearly/Darkly EP (2007)
Frisbee EP (2008)
I Think Therefore I Can (2010)
Sargassan EP (2011)
Se Altera el Caso EP [as 'Coco Lantano'] (2011)
Footwerk Makes One Free EP [as 'Del Vee Slakk'] (2012)
Tigerforce 10 Album [as TR-33N] (2015)

References

1979 births
Living people
English electronic musicians
People from Colchester
Musicians from Essex